Manuel Pamić (born 20 August 1986) is a Croatian footballer who plays as a left back and is the current player-manager of Smoljanci Sloboda.

Club career

Early career
Pamić started his career in the youth ranks of local club NK Žminj, where he stayed until 2004 before moving to NK Istra 1961 at the age of 18.  He impressed at the club and became a regular in the Pula squad.  His talent was noticed and in 2006 he made a move in NK Rijeka.

Red Bull Salzburg
He played with Rijeka one year producing 9 assists and scoring one goal (claimed to be the "best goal of the season" by the Croatian media) in the match against Zadar before he moved on, due to a direct request of the Salzburg's coach Trapattoni, to the Austrian Red Bull Salzburg in December 2007 for a fee of €1m. When he moved in the Austrian Club Niko Kovač, the captain of Red Bull Salzburg and of the Croatian national football team declared: "I can only congratulate my team on making this signing. Manuel ranks as one of the best talents in this position and he is certain to be considered for the Croatian national team sooner or later. Pamic is highly skilled and is really able to create some pressure down the left side". With the Austrians he played 6 matches in the first half of the year, and another 4 the second. Concluding his Austrian experience with a total of 11 matches, between League and Cup, producing also 2 assists.

Sparta Praha
In January 2009 he was loaned to Sparta Prague, a year later Sparta purchased him. With the Czech club Pamić played very well producing many assists, whilst also scoring some goals with powerful shots from distance. With Sparta he collected a total of 162 caps scoring 6 goals.

Chievo Verona
In the summer transfer window of July 2013 he made a move to the Italian club Chievo.
Pamić made his debut for Chievo on 17 August 2013 in an Italian's Cup match against Empoli. He made his debut in the League against Genoa, on 20 October 2013.

Siena
In the winter transfer window of January 2014, Pamić was loaned by Chievo to A.C. Siena.

International career
He was a very active member of almost all the Croatian youth association football national teams, from Under 16 until the Under 19 youth selection. Pamić has also played with the Croatian national under-21 team, where he made a total of 7 appearances.
He has become a regular call up for the Croatian national team, with whom he took part in the 2014 FIFA World Cup qualification. However, he has still not had a debut, under coach Slaven Bilić due to minor legal issues with his Manager and the Croatian HNS, Bilić has also called him for a starting team place in a match against Czech Republic in his native Pula where Pamić did not debut due to an injury, and time after under Igor Štimac, who has called up Pamić for much matches in 2014 FIFA World Cup qualification, but with Štimac has also can't debut due to still other injuries. Štimac had also call him for a lineup place in a friendly match against the Prva HNL- Selection, but Pamić had to postpone the debut, expressing his desire to stay with his pregnant wife.
Manuel Pamić has also received a call up from Czech national football team, but has refused stating: "I'm honored from the Czech call up, and maybe is better for me to play for the Czechs, cause Croatian National team and Coach continues to ignore me, but I must to refuse cause Croatia is my homeland and I love it."

Coaching career
After spells at amateur clubs in Croatia, Pamić was appointed manager of Smoljanci Sloboda at the end of September 2020. Pamić was also still active on the field, as he functioned as a player-coach.

Career statistics

Honours

Club
Sparta Praha
Gambrinus Liga (1): 2009–10
Czech Supercup (1): 2010

References

External links

 
 Profile at iDNES.cz
 

1986 births
Living people
People from Istria County
Sportspeople from Pula
Association football fullbacks
Croatian footballers
Croatia youth international footballers
Croatia under-21 international footballers
NK Žminj players
NK Istra 1961 players
HNK Rijeka players
FC Red Bull Salzburg players
AC Sparta Prague players
A.C. ChievoVerona players
A.C.N. Siena 1904 players
Frosinone Calcio players
NK Rovinj players
NK Novigrad players
Croatian Football League players
Austrian Football Bundesliga players
Czech First League players
Serie A players
Serie B players
First Football League (Croatia) players
Croatian expatriate footballers
Expatriate footballers in Austria
Croatian expatriate sportspeople in Austria
Expatriate footballers in the Czech Republic
Croatian expatriate sportspeople in the Czech Republic
Expatriate footballers in Italy
Croatian expatriate sportspeople in Italy
Croatian football managers